John Sasi (born 20 February 1979) is a Canadian rower. He competed in the men's lightweight double sculls event at the 2008 Summer Olympics.

References

1979 births
Living people
Canadian male rowers
Olympic rowers of Canada
Rowers at the 2008 Summer Olympics
Rowers from Hamilton, Ontario